The 1998 Texas 500 was the seventh stock car race of the 1998 NASCAR Winston Cup Series season and the second iteration of the event. The race was held on Sunday, April 5, 1998, in Fort Worth, Texas at Texas Motor Speedway, a 1.5 miles (2.4 km) permanent tri-oval shaped racetrack. The race took the scheduled 334 laps to complete. In the closing laps of the race, Roush Racing driver Mark Martin would manage to fend off teammate Chad Little to take his 24th career NASCAR Winston Cup Series victory and his second victory of the season. To fill out the podium, Little and Jasper Motorsports driver Robert Pressley would finish second and third, respectively.

Background 

Texas Motor Speedway is a speedway located in the northernmost portion of the U.S. city of Fort Worth, Texas – the portion located in Denton County, Texas. The track measures 1.5 miles (2.4 km) around and is banked 24 degrees in the turns, and is of the oval design, where the front straightaway juts outward slightly. The track layout is similar to Atlanta Motor Speedway and Charlotte Motor Speedway (formerly Lowe's Motor Speedway). The track is owned by Speedway Motorsports, Inc., the same company that owns Atlanta and Charlotte Motor Speedway, as well as the short-track Bristol Motor Speedway.

Entry list 

 (R) denotes rookie driver.

Practice 
Originally, four practice sessions were scheduled to be held, with two on Thursday, April 2, one on Friday, April 3, and one on Saturday, April 4. However, due to complaints about poor track conditions on Saturday that had occurred throughout pre-race, the final practice session was cancelled. Drivers had reported major bumps in the exit of turn 4, along with major seepage throughout the racetrack since the opening of the track in 1997.

First practice 
The first practice session was held on the afternoon of Thursday, April 2.

Second practice 
The third practice session was held on the evening of Thursday, April 2.

Final practice 
The planned third, but eventual final practice session was held on the morning of Friday, April 3.

Cancelled Happy Hour practice and complaints 
While a practice session was scheduled to be run on Saturday, April 4, numerous factors throughout the race weekend would eventually lead to the cancellation of the Happy Hour practice. Two major issues would plague the weekend; first, in response to the track surfacing issues in the 1997 race, turn four was repaved. However, the repavement would lead to a major bump on the exit of turn 4. Many drivers would complain to then-Texas Motor Speedway president Eddie Gossage about the bump, saying that the transition on the exit of turn 4 should be less severe. However, in response, Gossage would say that the turn was a unique corner of the speedway, comparing the turn to turn 4 at Darlington Raceway, saying "I understand where the Winston Cup drivers are coming from, but this is what we've got. A couple of drivers have said we need to move the wall in Turn 4. They've been saying that for 48 years at Darlington. Darlington should not move the wall back because that's what makes it quaint. Turn 4 is tricky. That's just the way it is.'' The second problem was water seepage problems in every turn but turn 2 due to heavy winter rains within the local area of the speedway, which would eventually lead to postponements of qualifying and practice sessions.

Driver reactions throughout the weekend were mostly negative of the track. Robert Yates Racing driver Dale Jarrett would call for multiple-groove racing, saying that "The biggest thing here is that we need more than the one groove we have, and it would make for better racing. Right now it's just going to be a follow-the-leader type deal. If a guy gets out on the outside, he's going to get passed by a lot of cars. Long-time driver Darrell Waltrip would report that while every racetrack had "something wrong with them", that Texas Motor Speedway was new and that "when you build a racetrack new, you're supposed to eliminate all that. There's no reason here not to do what needs to be done." Most drivers would report that they had felt that their cars had been too loose throughout the weekend, leading to a surplus of wrecks during practice and qualifying. Some drivers felt that the problems had been blown out of proportion, with Jeff Burton saying "It definitely has been blown out of proportion. There's too much fuss about it. What we need more than anything else is to work a second groove up higher. Once we do that, I think you will hear a lot fewer complaints."

Then-Texas Motor Speedway president Eddie Gossage would face harsh criticism for a lack of safety improvements since the inaugural race, the 1997 Interstate Batteries 500 and for trying to turn the complaints into a marketing scheme, with Gossage and Speedway Motorsports CEO Bruton Smith selling "Shut Up and Race" t-shirts at track souvenir stands for US$18 (adjusted for inflation$). In response, Gossage said that the new slogan for shirts would be to "Shut Up and Fix It" and that the track would look into fixing the bump in turn 4 along with fixing the turn 1 seepage issues.

Qualifying 
Qualifying was scheduled to be split into two rounds. Qualifying had run on Friday, April 3; however, after seven drivers made qualifying runs, due to complaints from drivers throughout race weekend, qualifying was eventually postponed to Saturday, April 4 with only one round. The seven drivers were forced to stand on their times on Friday.

The continuation of qualifying was held on Saturday, April 4, at 9:15 AM CST. Each driver would have one lap to set a time.

During qualifying, numerous drivers would crash. Derrike Cope would suffer a crash in turn 4, causing him to miss a race and several broken ribs. Then, Lake Speed would crash also, but would make the race on a provisional.

Five drivers would fail to qualify: Todd Bodine, Jerry Nadeau, Andy Hillenburg, Billy Standridge, and Derrike Cope.

Full qualifying results 

*Time not available.

Race results

References 

NASCAR races at Texas Motor Speedway
April 1998 sports events in the United States
1998 NASCAR Winston Cup Series
1998 in sports in Texas